Peter Attinger Jr. (born 15 January 1951) is a former Swiss curler and curling coach.

Teams

Private life
Peter Attinger grew up in a family of curlers. His father Peter Attinger Sr. is a 1972 Swiss men's champion (he was skip of a tem where Peter played and won his first national men's gold in 1972). His brothers - Bernhard, Werner, Ruedi and Kurt - are curlers too, they won Swiss and European championships and Worlds medals when they played in Peter Jr.'s team. His son Felix is skip of team, he won Swiss men's silver in 2017 and bronze in 2016; Peter coached his team. Bernhard's daughter Sandra Ramstein-Attinger is a competitive curler too, she played on three Women's Worlds with teams skipped by Silvana Tirinzoni and Binia Feltscher-Beeli.

References

External links
 

Living people
1951 births
Swiss male curlers
European curling champions
Swiss curling champions
Swiss curling coaches